MS Stena Scandinavica may refer to: 

  (built 1973) – Broken up in 2007
 MS Stena Scandinavica (built 1974) – Now  with C-bed
  (built 1983) – Now Stena Spirit with Stena Line
  (built 2003) – Current Stena Scandinavica

Ship names